Jkvr. Johanna Maria Sophia (Sophie) van der Does de Willebois ('s-Hertogenbosch, 26 November 1891 – Utrecht, 11 March 1961) was a Dutch ceramist.

Life and work 
Van der Does de Willebois studied at the Rijksakademie van beeldende kunsten in Amsterdam, where she took painting lessons from Richard Roland Holst. In 1919 she married Adriaan van Stolk (1883-1926). She moved with him to the Canary Islands. They had two children together, Jan van Stolk, who later became a ceramist, and Romualda Bogaerts, who would become a sculptor. In 1925 the family moved to Italy, where it settled in Vietri sul Mare. Van der Does purchased a local factory in maiolica. After the death of her husband in 1926, she worked with the Italian Luigi de Lerma (1907-1965) in the firm.

Van der Does abolished the company in 1928, and moved with the children to the Netherlands. Lerma became the director of "Ceramica Icara" on Rhodes. In 1930 Van der Does moved to Rhodes, where she married De Lerma. In 1934 the family settled in back in the Netherlands in Groenekan, where she and her husband started a pottery. They specialized in decorated dishes with fish, birds and plants. Van der Does also made some sculptures of female figures.

Van der Does was a member of the Dutch Association for Craft and Craft Art (V.A.N.K) and Painting and drawing society Kunstlliefde in Utrecht.

See also 
 List of Dutch ceramists

References

External links 

  Does de Willebois, Sophie van der at capriolus.nl
 Works of Does de Willebois, Sophie van der at Keramiekmuseum Princessehof.

1891 births
1961 deaths
Dutch ceramists
Dutch women ceramists
Jonkvrouws of the Netherlands
People from 's-Hertogenbosch
20th-century ceramists